The 1967 UCLA Bruins football team represented the University of California, Los Angeles (UCLA) in the 1967 NCAA University Division football season. The Bruins competed in what was then officially known as the Athletic Association of Western Universities, but informally known as the Pacific-8 Conference, a name it would formally adopt in June 1968.

The Bruins offense scored 284 points while the defense allowed 161 points.

Schedule

Personnel

Season summary

USC

Team players drafted into the NFL/AFL

Awards and honors
Gary Beban, Heisman Trophy 
Gary Beban, Maxwell Award

References

External links
 Game program: UCLA vs. Washington State at Spokane – September 30, 1967

UCLA
UCLA Bruins football seasons
UCLA Bruins football
UCLA Bruins football